The class secretary is a position in school student councils, usually associated with recording the minutes of council meetings.

Information
The class secretary is responsible for collecting trash and recording notes. They help the class leader record information on the class members, including class attendance and enrollment forms.  

The class secretary is supposed to pay close attention to the details and are required to have strong communications skills. Most educational institutions that hold a class secretary position also have a handbook for the class secretary. The class secretary helps ensure that all duties and meetings run smoothly.

References

Students' unions
Titles